Zoran Zečević is a Serbian politician. He was elected to the National Assembly of Serbia in 2022 as a member of the far-right Serbian Party Oathkeepers (Srpska stranka Zavetnici, SSZ).

Private career
Zečević is a surgeon living in Aranđelovac. In September 2022, it was reported that he was a co-owner of an illegal home for the elderly in the community, which was still operating despite a prior ban.

Politician
Zečević has a long history of involvement in far-right politics in Serbia. In the early 2000s, he was a member of the presidency of the Party of Serbian Unity (Stranka srpskog jedinstva, SSJ). The party contested the 2003 Serbian parliamentary election as part of the For National Unity electoral list, and Zečević appeared on the list in the seventy-seventh position. The list did not cross the electoral threshold for representation in the assembly. Zečević was later a prominent figure in SSJ leader Borislav Pelević's campaign for president of Serbia in the 2004 presidential election.

The SSJ merged into the Serbian Radical Party (Srpska radikalna stranka, SRS) in 2007, and Zečević appeared in the thirty-ninth position on the Radical Party's list in the 2008 Serbian parliamentary election. The list won seventy-eight seats, and he did not receive a mandate. (From 2000 to 2011, assembly mandates were awarded to sponsoring parties or coalitions rather than to individual candidates, and it was common practice for the mandates to be assigned out of numerical order. Zečević was not automatically elected by virtue of his list position.)

Pelević left the SRS in late 2008 to join the more moderate Serbian Progressive Party (Srpska napredna stranka, SNS). Zečević also left the Radicals at around the same time, although he did not join the Progressives. He led an independent list called "Aranđelovac in Belgrade–Movement for the Development of Serbia" in the 2010 local election in Aranđelovac. The list did not cross the threshold.

Serbia's electoral system was reformed in 2011, such that all mandates were awarded to candidates on successful lists in numerical order. Somewhat improbably, Zečević appeared on the list of the Social Democratic Alliance (Socijaldemokratski savez, SDS), a short-lived left-wing grouping, in the 2012 parliamentary election. This list, too, did not cross the threshold.

Boris Pelević left the SNS in 2013 and founded the Council of Serbian Unity (Sabor srpskog jedinstva, SSJ) as a successor group to the Party of Serbian Unity. Zečević became a vice-president of the party. The new SSJ contested the 2014 parliamentary election at the head of an alliance called the Patriotic Front (which also included the SSZ), and Zečević appeared in the second position on its list. Once again, the list did not cross the threshold. In 2015, Zečević was the SSJ's representative at a protest event in North Mitrovica commemorating the anniversary of the NATO bombing of Yugoslavia

The SSJ became inactive after 2015, and Zečević became a member of the SSZ. In 2021, he led a group of party members in disrupting a literary reading by Serbian author Svetislav Basara, on the grounds that he had written disparagingly about Desanka Maksimović, an important figure in Serbian literary history.

Zečević appeared in the fifth position on the SSZ's list in the 2016 parliamentary election and the lead position in the 2020 parliamentary election. In both cases, the list fell below the threshold. He was given the second position on the party's list in  the 2022 Serbian parliamentary election, behind the party's main spokesperson Milica Đurđević Stamenkovski, and was elected when the list won ten seats. The SNS and its allies won the election, and the SSZ serves in opposition. (Zečević also appeared in the seventh position on the SSZ's list in Aranđelovac in the concurrent 2022 local elections. The list won five seats, and he was not immediately elected.)

Zečević is now a member of the assembly's health and family committee; a member of the committee on the economy, regional development, trade, tourism, and energy; and a deputy member of the committee on the rights of the child.

References

1956 births
Living people
People from Aranđelovac
Members of the National Assembly (Serbia)
Party of Serbian Unity politicians
Serbian Radical Party politicians
Social Democratic Alliance (Serbia) politicians
Council of Serbian Unity politicians
Serbian Party Oathkeepers politicians